Aglaoschema prasinipenne is a species of beetle in the family Cerambycidae. It was described by Hippolyte Lucas in 1857.

References

Aglaoschema
Beetles described in 1857